"Together" is a song by American singer Amii Stewart and Italian musician Mike Francis, released as a single in 1985. The duet was a number nine hit in Italy in July 1985. It appeared on Francis' 1985 album Features, and Stewart's 1985 compilation album The Best of Amii Stewart.

References

1985 songs
1985 singles
Amii Stewart songs
Songs written by Mike Francis
RCA Records singles
Italo disco songs
Male–female vocal duets